Vermontville may refer to a community in the United States:

 Vermontville, Michigan, a village
 Vermontville Township, Michigan
 Vermontville, New York, a hamlet